Zaur Sabir oghlu Javanshir is an Azerbaijani military officer, major general serving in the special forces of the Azerbaijani Armed Forces. He had taken part in the 2016 Nagorno-Karabakh clashes and 2020 Nagorno-Karabakh war, and was one of the commanders of the Azerbaijani special forces during the Battle of Shusha, for which he had received the title of the Hero of the Patriotic War.

Early years 
Zaur Sabir oglu Javanshir was born in Hindarx of the Aghjabadi District in the Azerbaijani SSR, then Soviet Union. He is a descendant of Panah Ali Khan, the founder and first ruler of the Karabakh Khanate who built the Shusha fortress.

Military service 
Zaur Javanshir currently serves in the special forces of the Azerbaijani Armed Forces. He had taken part in the 2016 Nagorno-Karabakh clashes. Participating in the 2020 Nagorno-Karabakh war, he commanded the Azerbaijani special forces during the Battle of Shusha. Javanshir was appointed the first commandant of Shusha, and marched with the Victory Flag, which is the flag that was hoisted in Shusha, in the 2020 Victory Parade in Baku.

Awards 
 Zaur Javanshir was awarded the Azerbaijani Flag Order on 24 June 2005, by the decree of the President of Azerbaijan, Ilham Aliyev.
 Zaur Javanshir was promoted to the rank of major general on 7 December 2020, by the decree of the President Aliyev.
 Zaur Javanshir was awarded the title of the Hero of the Patriotic War on 9 December 2020, by the decree of the President Aliyev.

References 

People from Aghjabadi District
Azerbaijani generals
2016 Nagorno-Karabakh clashes
Heroes of the Patriotic War
Living people
Year of birth missing (living people)
Azerbaijani Land Forces personnel of the 2020 Nagorno-Karabakh war